Ortholasma is a genus of harvestmen in the family Nemastomatidae. There are about 13 described species in Ortholasma.

Species
These 13 species belong to the genus Ortholasma:

 Ortholasma colossus Shear, 2010
 Ortholasma coronadense Cockerell, 1916
 Ortholasma coronadensis Cockerell
 Ortholasma levipes Shear & Gruber, 1983
 Ortholasma pictipes Banks, 1911
 Ortholasma rugosum Banks, 1894
 Trilasma chipinquensis Shear, 2010
 Trilasma hidalgo Shear, 2010
 Trilasma petersprousei Shear, 2010
 Trilasma ranchonuevo Shear, 2010
 Trilasma tempestado Shear, 2010
 Trilasma trispinosum Shear, 2010
 Trilasma tropicum Shear, 2010

References

Further reading

External links

 

Harvestmen
Articles created by Qbugbot
Taxa named by Nathan Banks